Đura Sentđerđi (1900–1980) was a Yugoslav swimmer. He competed in the men's 400 metre freestyle event at the 1924 Summer Olympics.

References

External links
 

1900 births
1980 deaths
Serbian male swimmers
Yugoslav male swimmers
Olympic swimmers of Yugoslavia
Swimmers at the 1924 Summer Olympics
Sportspeople from Sombor